Gateway Academy may refer to:

 Gateway Academy (Laredo, Texas), a charter high school in Laredo, Texas, United States
 Gateway Academy, Scottsdale, a private special school in Scottsdale, Arizona, United States

See also
 Gateway (disambiguation)